Tatiana Sergeyevna Tudvaseva (born 3 September 1997) is a Russian pair skater. With former partner Sergei Lisiev, she qualified for the 2011–12 Junior Grand Prix Final and finished 6th. They were coached by Ludmila Kalinina and Alexei Menshikov in Saransk, after previously training in Perm region.

Programs 
(with Lisiev)

Competitive highlights 
(with Lisiev)

References

External links 

 
 Tatiana Tudvaseva / Sergei Lisiev at sport-folio.net
 Tatiana Sergeyevna Tudvaseva at fskate.ru 

Russian female pair skaters
1997 births
Living people
Sportspeople from Perm, Russia